"That Rock Won't Roll" is a song written by Bob DiPiero and John Scott Sherrill and recorded by American country music group Restless Heart. It was released in August 1986 as the lead single from the album, Wheels. The song was Restless Heart's fifth country hit and the first of six consecutive number one country singles. The single went to number 1 for a week and spent a total of 23 weeks on the charts.

Charts

References
 

1986 singles
1986 songs
Restless Heart songs
Songs written by Bob DiPiero
Songs written by John Scott Sherrill
Song recordings produced by Scott Hendricks
RCA Records Nashville singles